Garth C. Edmundson (b. 11 Apr 1892, Pennsylvania; d. 2 Apr 1971, New Castle, Pennsylvania) was an American organist, composer, music director, and music teacher.

Formal training 
Edmundson studied music in Pittsburgh, New York, London, Paris, and at the Leipzig Conservatory. His instructors were Harvey Gaul, Lynnwood Farnam, Joseph Bonnet, and Isidor Philipp.

Professional career 
Edmundson was an organist, music teacher, and director of music in several churches and schools in western Pennsylvania.  Edmundson began his career as church organist and minister of music at First Presbyterian Church in New Castle and played special masses at St. Mary Church. He composed hundreds of compositions for organ, including

 Impression Gothiques
 Imagery in Tableaux
 Vom Himmel Hoch

Honors and awards 
 Honorary doctorate degree – Doctor of Music, Westminster College, New Wilmington, Pennsylvania.

Affiliations 
Edmundson was a member of ASCAP and Trinity Episcopal Church.  He also was a 32nd Degree Mason.

Selected published works 
 Four Modern Preludes on Old Chorals (Vater Unser - Eudoxia - Evan - Vom Himmel hoch)
 Hail the Day (Ascension), (1956) anthem for mixed voices
 Humoresque Fantastique
 To the Setting Sun
 Toccata on "How Brightly Shines the Morning Star"
 Toccata-Prelude on "St. Ann's"
 Seven Modern Preludes on Ancient Themes for organ, J. Fischer & Bro. (1937). Includes:
 Chorus Novae Jerusalem (Ye Choirs, O New Jerusalem)
 Pange Lingua Gloriosi (Sing My Tongue)
 Veni Creator Spiritus (Come Holy Spirit)
 Ecce Jam Noctis (Lo! the Night)
 Vexilla Regis (The Royal Banner)
 Dies Irae (Day of Wrath)
 Divinium Mysterium (Of the Fathers Love)
 Garth Edmundson, In Modum Antiquum, Book Two, J. Fischer & Bro. (1936); Includes:

Pandean Pastoral
Caravan of the Magi
Humuresque Gracieuse
In Silent Night
Mereauesque Toccata

A selection of Edmundson's printed works is available here http://www.onlinesheetmusic.com/garth-edmundson-a77827.aspx?type=list

Audio samples 
 Vom Himmel Hoch, Toccata, Prelude IV from Christus Advenit (Christmas Suite No. 2), based on the German Christmas carol "Vom Himmel Hoch"
 , Graham Barber, organist, Schulze organ at St. Bartholomew's Church, Armley, England 
 , Cathedral Church of St. John the Evangelist, Salford, Greater Manchester, England
 , Andrew Lucas, organist, St. Paul's Cathedral, London
 , Ralph Cupper, organist

References 
General citations
 Charles Eugene Claghorn (1911-2005), Biographical Dictionary of American Music, Parker Publishing Co., West Nyack, New York (1973)
 Contemporary American Composers, first edition, compiled by E. Ruth Anderson (1928– ), G.K. Hall & Co., Boston (1976)
 Contemporary American Composers, second edition, compiled by E. Ruth Anderson (1928– ), G.K. Hall & Co., Boston (1982)
 The ASCAP Biographical Dictionary, third edition. American Society of Composers, Authors and Publishers, New York (1966)
 ASCAP Biographical Dictionary, fourth edition, compiled for the American Society of Composers, Authors and Publishers by Jaques Cattell Press, New York, R.R. Bowker (1980)

Inline citations

1892 births
1971 deaths
American classical organists
American male organists
American male composers
20th-century American composers
20th-century organists
20th-century American male musicians
Male classical organists